Basel-Stadt or Basel-City is one of the 26 cantons forming the Swiss Confederation. It is composed of three municipalities with Basel as the capital. It is traditionally considered a "half-canton", the other half being Basel-Landschaft, its rural counterpart.

Basel-Stadt is one of the northernmost and lowest cantons of Switzerland, and the smallest by area. The canton lies on both sides of the Rhine and is very densely populated. The largest municipality is Basel, followed by Riehen and Bettingen. The only canton sharing borders with Basel-Stadt is Basel-Landschaft to the south. To the north of Basel-Stadt are France and Germany, with the tripoint being in the middle of the Rhine.

Together with Basel-Landschaft, Basel-Stadt was part of the canton of Basel, who joined the Old Swiss Confederacy in 1501. Political quarrels and armed conflict led to the partition of the canton in 1833.

Basel-Stadt is Switzerland's seventh-largest economic centre and has the highest GDP per capita in the country, ahead of the cantons of Zug and Geneva (in 2018). In terms of value, over 94% of Basel City's goods exports are in the chemical and pharmaceutical sectors. With production facilities located in the neighbouring Schweizerhalle, Basel accounts for 20% of Swiss exports.

History
The canton of Basel-Stadt was created when the historic canton of Basel was divided in 1833, following political quarrels and armed conflict in the canton. Some of these were concerned with the rights of the population in the agricultural areas. They ultimately led to the separation of the canton of Basel-Landschaft from the city of Basel on 26 August 1833. Since then, there has been a movement for reunification. This movement gained momentum after 1900 when many parts of Basel-Landschaft became industrialized. The two half-cantons agreed in principle to reunite, but in 1969, and again in September 2014, the people of Basel-Landschaft voted against this proposal in favour of retaining their independence.

Geography

The canton of Basel-Stadt is located in the north of Switzerland. Basel is located at the so-called 'knee' of the Rhine, at the point where from the west the little Birsig joins the Rhine from the left, and where the Rhine itself switches from flowing in a westerly direction to a northerly flow. It is the second flattest canton, with a height difference of only 277 metres between the Rhine and St. Chrischona.

Bettingen, Riehen and a part of Basel city lie on the east bank of the Rhine, bordered on three sides by the German state of Baden-Württemberg. The rest of the canton lies on the west bank of the Rhine.

It is sometimes likened to a city-state.

Basel-Stadt borders Basel-Landschaft to the south, the only adjacent canton. To the north, it borders Germany (Baden-Württemberg) and France (Grand Est). The three countries meet in the middle of the Rhine, about 150 metres north of the Dreiländereck monument.

Municipalities
There are three municipalities:

Politics
The canton of Basel-Stadt shares its political structure and administration with the municipality of Basel.

 is a half-canton. This means that the canton only sends one representative to the Council of States. The capital of the canton  is the city of Basel. The present constitution of the canton dates from 1889. Since 1966 women were allowed to vote in Canton, as the first German speaking canton.

The parliament of the canton is the Grand Council, which has 100 members, who are elected for four years at a time. There are eight different political parties represented in the parliament; the largest party is the Social Democratic Party, with 32 seats.

The executive of the canton is made up of seven members.

The canton has a sister state status with Massachusetts.

Federal election results

 FDP before 2009, FDP.The Liberals after 2009
 "*" indicates that the party was not on the ballot in this canton.
 Part of the FGA
 Part of the POCH
 Part of the GPS

Demographics

Historical population 
The historical population is given in the following table:

, the population included 56,106 foreigners, or about 30.29% of the total population. The population is nearly evenly split between Roman Catholic (25%) and Protestant (27%). About 10% of the population is classed as "Other Religion" while 36% do not belong to any organized religion.

Economy

The economic area of Basel is considered to be the second largest economic centre in Switzerland, after Zurich.
The chemical industry and the pharmaceutical industry are of greatest significance in the canton. There are a number of multinationals in the city of Basel, attracting workers from both cantons of Basel and the areas across the border in France and Germany. Banking and finance are important as is the service sector in general. Small and middle-sized businesses employ a significant number of people, both in the city as the two municipalities. The canton is also known for its banking sector, and for being the worldwide seat of the Bank for International Settlements.

Economically, the neighbouring lands in Germany and France are not separated from the area of the canton of Basel-Stadt. Good transport links across the border, as well as supportive local governments, facilitate this link.

The fact that three nation-states come together in one spot near Basel helps attract tourists. The site is clearly identified and a popular destination for primary school classes. The carnival attracts a large number of people from across Switzerland and the neighbouring countries.

In 2014, there were 104 workers in Basel-Stadt who worked in the primary sector (the total for all of Switzerland is 3.3%). In the same year the secondary sector employed 36,441 or about 19.0% of the total workforce. Of those in the secondary sector, nearly half of the workers were involved in the production of pharmaceutical products. The tertiary sector employed 154,896 or about 80.9% of the total, which is slightly higher than 74.9% nationwide. Of those in the tertiary sector, health care, education and retail sales made up about a quarter. Some of the other major tertiary fields included job placement (5.1%), management and business consulting (4.1%), public administration (3.9%), architectural and engineering offices (3.7%) and financial services (3.5%).

Transport

There is an international airport at Basel-Mulhouse, actually located  inside French territory but with customs-free access from the city. The canton is well connected by both trains and motorways to the rest of Switzerland and the neighbouring areas in France and Germany.

Basel is a major railway station of Switzerland, connected to Paris and Berlin with direct fast trains.

There is a port at Basel for ships on the Rhine. This port is of great significance to landlocked Switzerland, as it offers the country's only direct connection to the sea. The port benefits from good connections to both rail and road.

Culture

The Carnival of Basel is a major cultural event in the year. The carnival is one of the biggest in Switzerland and attracts large crowds, despite the fact that many of its central traditions are played out in the early morning starting at 4am and followed by a continuous run of festivities for 72 hours.

The Autumn Fair in Basel is the biggest in Switzerland.

The canton of Basel is renowned for two of its biscuits. The Basler Läckerli is a hard biscuit made of honey, almonds, candied peel and Kirsch, and is enjoyed as a speciality all year round. The Basler Brunsli is made of almonds and generally enjoyed at Christmas all around Switzerland.

The Basel Messe convention center is the location of several international events. The largest are Art Basel, an art show for modern and contemporary works, and BaselWorld, a major watch and jewellery show.

Famous cultural ambassadors of Basel are the Top Secret Drum Corps and the Basel Boys Choir.

See also
 List of castles and fortresses in Switzerland
 Swiss plateau
 Pharmaceutical industry

Notes and references

External links

 
 Official statistics
 

 
Cantons of Switzerland
1833 establishments in Switzerland